Bruno Radicioni (10 December 1933 – 17 April 1997) was an Italian painter, sculptor and ceramist, lived for a decade in Canada.

Biography

He attended the local School of Art in his native town, Fano, then initially dedicated to the pottery in Pesaro, at the Ceramic Art Ferruccio Mengaroni working together with other Italian potters. From 1953 to 1962 he was in Canada and the United States of America, living  in Toronto, Montreal and New York City, where he participated in group exhibitions at national and international. He also set personal, Toronto and other Canadian cities and in the same period he was commissioned, by Alitalia, a large panel to be placed within the Montreal International Airport. He returned to Italy, took part in collective and personal exhibitions in various cities in Italy and abroad, such as Rome, Paris, Moscow, New York City, Ingolstadt, Milan, Brescia, Venice, Rimini, Ravenna, Pesaro, Fano, and other. His personal exhibition of painting in Urbino in 1972, the house-museum of Raffaello Sanzio, had special significance. Significant and celebratory, to consecrate Bruno Radicioni was the show at the church of San Domenico, Urbino in the early 1990s. Here finally crystallized his figures as bald style. Referred to as "Figures in Time", as they were inserted at a later Renaissance painting, to the fullest expression of the figurative element as essential and indispensable for understanding the value of the symbolic figure of Bruno Radicioni. He has collectors in Italy and worldwide. He made drawings and lithographs by widespread even in international magazines.

References

1933 births
1997 deaths
People from Fano
20th-century Italian painters
Italian male painters
20th-century Italian male artists